The Advaita Guru-Paramparā ("Lineage of Gurus in Non-dualism") is the traditional lineage (parampara) of divine, Vedic and historical teachers of Advaita Vedanta. It begins with the Daiva-paramparā, the gods; followed by the Ṛṣi-paramparā, the Vedic seers; and then the Mānava-paramparā, with the historical teachers Gaudapada and Shankara, and four of Shankara's pupils. Of the five contemporary acharyas, the heads of the five Advaita mathas, four acharyas trace their lineage to those four pupils and one to Adi Shankara himself.

From mediaeval times, Advaita Vedanta influenced other Indian religions as well, and since the 19th century it came to be regarded as the central philosophy of Indian religion. Several Neo-Vedanta movements and teachers, most notably the Ramakrishna Order, trace their roots to Advaita Vedanta, while the Inchegeri Sampradaya (Nisargadatta Maharaj) and Ramana Maharshi are popularly considered as Advaita Vedanta, though rooted in respectively the Nath and Tamil folk Saivite religion.

Advaita Vedanta and paramparā
Advaita Vedanta is an Indian religious tradition of textual exegesis and yogic praxis, which states that the knowledge of the unity of Atman and Brahman is liberating. It is based on the textual exegesis of the Upanishads, the Brahma Sutras, and the Bhagavad Gita. It traces its roots back to Vedic times, as described in the Advaita Guru Paramparā, the Advaita version of the Guru–shishya tradition. Historically, Adi Shankara is regarded as its most influential teacher. This influence goes back to medieval times, when Advaita Vedanta came to be regarded as the central philosophy of the post-Vedic religions, and its philosophy influenced several Indian religious traditions.

In several Indian religious and philosophical traditions, all knowledge is traced back to the Gods and to the Rishis who saw the Vedas. The successive rishis and teachers of various Indian traditions are honoured in Guru-paramparās, lists of teachers in the Guru–shishya traditions.

Deva, Rsi and Manav Paramparā
The current Acharyas, the heads of the four maṭhas set up by Adi Shankara, trace their authority back to the four main disciples of Shankara. Each of the heads of these four maṭhas takes the title of Shankaracharya ("the learned Shankara") after Adi Shankara.

Deva, Rsi and Manav Paramparā

The Advaita guru-paramparā (Lineage of Gurus in Non-dualism) begins with the mythological time of the Daiva-paramparā, followed by the vedic seers of the Ṛṣi-paramparā, and the Mānava-paramparā of historical times and personalities:
Daiva-paramparā
 Nārāyaṇa
 Padmabhuva (Brahmā)
Ṛṣi-paramparā
 Vaśiṣṭha
 Śakti
 Parāśara
 Vyāsa
 Śuka
'Mānava-paramparā
 Gauḍapāda
 Govinda bhagavatpāda
 Śankara bhagavatpāda, and then Shankara's four disciples
 Padmapāda
 Hastāmalaka
 Toṭaka
 Vārtikakāra (Sureśvara) and others

Each Yuga has its own gurus or Acharyas:
 In the Satya or Krata Yuga: Lord Narayana and Lord Brahma.
 In the Treta Yuga: Vasishta Maharishi, Śakti Maharṣi and Parashara Maharishi.
 In the Dvapara Yuga: Veda Vyasa and Sri Shuka Acharya
 In the Kali Yuga: Sri Gaudapada Acharya, Govinda Bhagavatpadacharya, Shri Shankarāchārya, and the subsequent lineage.

Another famous sloka lists the essential Advaita Guru parampara as follows:
Sada Shiva Samarambham
Sankaracharya Madhyamam
Asmat aacharya Paryantham
Vande Guru Paramparaa
 
Which translates as :
Beginning with lord Sadashiva, 
With Sankaracharya in the middle, 
And till my acharya, 
I bow to the tradition of teachers

Jagadgurus of the four Advaita Mathas

According to tradition, Sankara organised a section of the Ēkadaṇḍisannyāsins into the Dashanami Sampradaya, establishing four mathas in north, west, east, and south India, to facilitate the teaching of Advaita Vedanta, and maintain the dharma. He entrusted his four disciples to each of these four mathas. Some of the famous and current Mathadhipatis titled 'Sankaracharyas' are listed below:
 Sringeri Sharada Peetham
Sri Sacchidananda Shivabhinava Narasimha Bharathi Mahaswami, Jagadguru of Sringeri Sharada Peetham    (1865–1912); initiated many into Adi Shankaracharya's philosophy including Sacchidanandendra Saraswati- founder of Adhyatma Prakashana Karyalaya; known as "Abhinava Shankara" because of his many tours around Bharatvarsha spreading the Advaita Vedanta philosophy and Hindu Dharma
Sri Chandrashekhara Bharathi Mahaswami, Jagadguru of Sringeri Sharada Peetham (1912–1954).
Sri Abhinavavidya Tirtha Mahaswamiji, Jagadguru of Sringeri Sharada Peetham (1954–1989); A great Yogi and master of scriptures. In His many tours of Bharatvarsha and also Nepal He established many maths, shrines and temples.
Sri Bharathi Tirtha Mahaswami, Jagadguru of Sringeri Sharada Peetham (1989- ); A sage and present Jagadguru of Shringeri Peetha, Sringeri, Karnataka.
 Jyotir Math
 Swaroopanand Saraswati
 Govardhan Peetham
 Kalika Pitha

Acharyas known from literary sources

Ancient Acharyas
 Yajnavalkya: taught Brahmavidya to his wife Maitreyi, which is recorded in Brhadaranyaka Upanishad.
 Uddalaka: taught Brahmavidya to his son Svetaketu in Chandogya Upanishad.

Pre-Badarayana Acharyas
Works of these Advaita Acharyas are not available now, but were quoted by Badarayana:
 Badari (referred to in Br. Su. I.2.30, III.1.1, IV.3.7, IV.4.10)
 Audulomi (referred to in Br. Su. I.3.21, III.4.45, IV.4.6)
 Kasakrtsna (referred to in Br. Su. I.4.220
 Asmarathya (referred to in Br. Su. I.2.29, I.4.20)
 Atreya (referred to in Br. Su. III.4.4)
 Karsajini (referred to in Br. Su. III.1.9)
 Badarayana, author of Brahmasutra, containing 555 sutras, that reconciles the apparent ambiguity of the Upanishads.

Post-Badrayana Acharyas
Works of the following Acharyas are available and are still being taught and studied:
 Bodhayana (pre-Sankara) (Bodhayana-vrtti)
 Brahmanandin (Vakyakara) (Commentary on Chandogyopanishad)
 Dravidacharya (Commentary on Brhadaranyakopanishad)
 Sundarapandya (Vartikakara) (Vartika on Sariraka-Mimamsa)
 Bhartrprapanca
 Gaudapada (700–780 approx.) (Karika on Mandukyopanishad)
 Govinda bhagavatpāda (750–850 approx.) (Brahmasiddhi)
 Śankara bhagavatpāda (Adi Shankara) (788–820) (Commentary on the Prasthana-traya and Upadesha-Sahasri)

Post-Sankara Acharyas
 Sureswara (8th century), also known as Vartikakara. (Vartika on Sankara's Taittiriyopanishad-Bhashya, Brhadaranyakopanishad-Bhashyam, Naishkarmyasiddhi, Manasollasa)
 Padmapada (8th century) (Pancapadika)
 Hastamalaka (8th century) (Hastamalakiyam)
 Vacaspati Mishra (841–900) (Bhamati, a Tika on Brahmasutra-Sankara-Bhashyam))
 Sarvajnatma Muni (850–950) (Sankshepa-Sariraka)
 Sriharsha (1169–1225) (Khandana-khanda-khadya)
 Prakasatma Yati (AD 1200) (Pancapadika-Vivarana)
 Citsukha (AD 1220) (Citsukhi)
 Ananda Giri - also known as the Tikakara. (Tikas on almost all the Bhashyas of Sankara. It is said nobody knows the mind of Sankara, better than Ananda Giri.)
 Vimuktatma (AD 1200) (Ishtasiddhi)
 Amalananda (AD 1247) (Vedanta-Kalpataru, a commentary on Bhamati of Vacaspati Misra)
 Bĥaratī Tīrtha (1328-1380), the teacher of Vidyaranya  (Dŗg-Dŗśya-Viveka)
 Vidyaranya (1350–1386) (Pancadasi)
 Sadananda Yogindra (mid 15th century) (Vedantasara, the most popular introductory text in Advaita Vedanta)
 Dharmaraja Adhvarindra (1550–1650) (Vedanta-Paribhasha, an epistemological work on Advaita Vedanta)
 Nrsimha Ashrama (1500–1600)
 Madhusudana Saraswati (1565–1650) (Advaita-siddhi)
 Appaya Dikshita (AD 1603) (Parimala, Siddhanta-lesa-sangraha)
 Lakshmidhara Kavi (Advaita-Makaranda)

Neo-Vedanta

While strictly speaking only members of the Dashanami Sampradaya belong to the Advaita Guru Paramparā, Advaita Vedanta has attracted popular recognition since the 19th century, and Neo-Vedanta movements have developed with roots in, of similarities with, the Advaita tradition.

Ramakrishna Order
 Sri Ramakrishna Paramahamsa
 Swami Vivekananda (1863–1902), disciple of Sri Ramakrishna, wrote books on four Hindu Yogas: Bhakti Yoga, Jnana Yoga, Karma Yoga and Raja Yoga. The Complete Works of Swami Vivekananda contains a complete collection of transcribed lectures. He spoke at the Parliament of the World's Religions in Chicago in 1893.
Disciples of Ramakrishna

Mata Amritanandamayi Math
Mata Amritanandamayi Math, founded by Sri Mata Amritanandamayi devi follows Advaita philosophy and traditions. The sanyasis are initiated in the Puri order of Dashanami Sampradaya. According to the tradition set forth by Adi Shankaracharya, the Puri Sannyasa tradition is characterised by the following – formal allegiance to the Shringeri Math

 First Acharya (teacher) - Sureśvaracharya
 Sampradaya (customs) - Bhurivara Sampradaya 
 Kshetra (Temple) – Rameswaram
 Deva (God) –  Adi Varaha Swamy (The incarnation of Lord Vishnu in the form of a boar)
 Devi (Goddess) – Kamakshi
 Veda – Yajurveda
 Upanishad – Kaṭhopaniṣad 
 Mahavakya (statement revealing the nature of Absolute Reality ) – Ahaṁ Brahmāsmi
 Tirtha (Holy River) – Tungabhadra River
 Gotra (descent or lineage) – Bhaveshavar Rishi

Swami Amritaswarupananda Puri was the first to be initiated as Sanyasin by Sri Mata Amritanandamayi devi in this order. Swami Amritatmananda Puri, Swami Ramakrishnananda Puri, Swami Pranavamritananda Puri, Swamini Krishnamrita Prana and Swami Poornamritananda Puri are other few notable sanyasis initiated in this order.

Divine Life Society, Chinmaya Mission, Arsha Vidya Gurukulam

 Swami Tapovan Maharaj (1889–1957): A Virakta mahatma, Guru of Swami Chinmayananda post the latter's Sanyas Deeksha by Swami Sivananda 
 Swami Sivananda (1887–1963): Hindu Saint who founded the Divine Life Society in Rishikesh, India. Author of more than 300 works of theology and philosophy. According to his disciples, achieved Moksha upon death. Bestowed sanyasa upon 
Swami Krishnananda (1922–2001), Hindu saint who was the General Secretary of the Divine Life Society in Rishikesh, India from 1958 to 2001. Foremost disciple of Swami Sivananda. Author of more than 200 works of theology and philosophy. According to disciples, achieved Moksha upon death.
 Swami Chinmayananda (1916–1993), (1916–1993), Sannyas diksha bestowed by Swami Sivananda in Rishikesh. Disciples founded the Chinmaya Mission; 'Chinmaya' means "pure consciousness.".
Swami Dayananda Saraswati, (1930–2015) Founder of 'Arsha Vidya' tradition. He has set up Gurukulams in Rishikesh, Coimbatore, Nagpur, Saylorsburg (USA), has taught ten long-term courses in Advaita Vedanta, and has initiated more than 200 disciples into Sannyasa, among them being; Swami Paramarthananda and Swami Tattvavidananda. The advaita teacher and author Sri Vasudevacharya is also a disciple. 
 Swami Chidananda (1916–2008)
 Swami Shantananda Saraswati (1934-2005)

Other teachers
 Mannargudi Raju Sastri (1815–1903), Formed 'The Advaita Sabha' for propagating the tenets of the Advaita faith.
 Sri Narayana Guru (1856–1928)- Vedic scholar, mystic philosopher, prolific poet and social reformer, from the present-day Kerala.
 Sri Aurobindo (1872–1950) Bengali philosopher-sage who synthesized Advaita thought with Western philosophical theories of evolution.
 Tibbetibaba (-d.1930) - Hindu Bengali Saint whose life was based on both Advaita Vedanta and Mahayana principles.
 Swami Atmananda (1883–1959) lived in Kerala.
 Prajnanapada (1891–1974), disciple of Niralamba Swami and a great exponent of Advaita philosophy. He was in charge of Channa Ashram in West Bengal, India.
 Bhagawan Nityananda (1897?–1961) was an Indian guru. His teachings are published in the "Chidakash Gita". Nityananda was born in Koyilandy (Pandalayini), Kerala, South India. His teachings are simple and on the nonduality.
 Swami Karpatri (1905–1980), a well-known sannyasi of Varanasi
 Swami Parthasarathy (1927- ), Popularly referred to as 'Swamiji', Parthasarathy is known as the modern exponent of Vedanta. He has written 10 books in all, including commentaries on Bhagavad Gita, Atmabodha, Bhaja Govindam and many other books. His ashram is situated around 100 km from Mumbai in the hills of Malavli, near Lonavla. 
 G. Balakrishnan Nair Vedanta scholar, Sanskrit academician, philosopher, author and interpreter of the scriptures and Vedanta.
 Vagbhatananda Kunjikkannan (1885-1939).  intellectual figure, Social Reformer and Advaitin.

Advaita Vedanta interpreted

Inchegeri Sampradaya

The Inchegeri Sampradaya is rooted in the Nath-tradition, but is popularly regarded as Advaita Vedanta.

Siddharameshwar Maharaj
Sri Nisargadatta Maharaj (1897–1981) - A 20th-century master of Advaita from Mumbai, I Am That (1973, collected talks)
 Ramesh Balsekar (1917–2009)

Ramana Maharshi
Ramana Maharshi underwent a profound religious experience when he was 16, whereafter he left home to become a sanyassin. While his own (spare) writings reveal his Tamil Saivite background, devotees with a Brahmon and/or Neo-Vedanta background have interpreted him in an Advaita Vedanta framework. His popularisation in the west was initially aided by a Theosophical framework, while his devotee Poonja spawned the Neo-Advaita movement, which was also influenced by Bhagwan Shree Rajneesh.

 Shri Ramana Maharshi (1879–1950) the silent sage of Tamil Nadu who had a profound realization of nonduality.
 Sri H.W.L. Poonja (1910–1997), or Papaji. Devotee of Sri Ramana Maharshi, he denied being part of any formal tradition, and remained always available, welcoming newcomers to his home and satsangs.

See also 

 List of teachers of Vedanta
 List of Hindus

Notes

References

Sources

 

Hindu philosophical concepts
Advaitin philosophers
Schools and traditions in ancient Indian philosophy
Lists of Hindu religious leaders
Advaita Vedanta
Hinduism-related lists